Sai San Aung (born 25 March 1959) is a Burmese politician who currently serves as a House of Nationalities member of parliament for Shan State № 12 constituency  .

Early life and education
He was  born on 25 March 1959 in Shan State, Burma(Myanmar).

Political career
He is a member of the Union Solidarity and Development Party. In the Myanmar general election, 2015, he was elected as an Amyotha Hluttaw MP, winning a majority of 7999 votes and elected representative from Shan State № 12 parliamentary   constituency  .

References

Union Solidarity and Development Party politicians
1959 births
Living people
People from Shan State
Mandalay University alumni